Sander Henrique Bortolotto (born 3 October 1990), simply known as Sander, is a Brazilian professional footballer who plays as a left back for Goiás.

Club career
Born in Corumbá de Goiás, Sander finished his formation with São Luiz, and made his senior debut with Três Passos in 2011. He subsequently moved to Concórdia in the same year, and on 12 July 2012 was announced at Tupy de Crissiumal.

After a short spell at Panambi, Sander featured regularly for Tupi during the 2013 season, also scoring a goal in the Campeonato Gaúcho Série B final against Nova Prata which ensured the club's first professional title of their history. On 29 November 2013, he agreed to a move to São José-RS.

On 1 April 2014 Sander signed for Rio Branco-AC, and impressed enough to secure a move to Série A side Avaí on 20 January 2015. However, he only featured rarely for the club, and joined Cruzeiro-RS on 1 March 2016.

On 18 April 2016, Sander signed a contract with Ypiranga-RS until the end of the year. On 20 December he returned to his previous club, becoming an undisputed starter for the side and being named the best left back of the 2017 Campeonato Gaúcho.

On 6 June 2017, Sander signed for top tier club Sport.

Career statistics

Honours

Club
Tupy-RS
Campeonato Gaúcho Série B: 2013

Rio Branco-AC
Campeonato Acreano: 2014

Sport
Campeonato Pernambucano: 2017, 2019

Individual
Campeonato Gaúcho Best eleven: 2017
Campeonato Gaúcho Best newcomer: 2017

References

External links

1990 births
Living people
Sportspeople from Goiás
Brazilian footballers
Association football defenders
Campeonato Brasileiro Série C players
Esporte Clube São José players
Rio Branco Atlético Clube players
Avaí FC players
Esporte Clube Cruzeiro players
Ypiranga Futebol Clube players
Sport Club do Recife players